Seydi Dinçtürk (1922 – 6 July 2019) was a Turkish sprinter. He competed in the men's 4 × 400 metres relay at the 1948 Summer Olympics.

References

1922 births
2019 deaths
Athletes (track and field) at the 1948 Summer Olympics
Turkish male sprinters
Turkish male middle-distance runners
Olympic athletes of Turkey
Place of birth missing
20th-century Turkish people